No defending champions were officially declared as the last edition dates back to 1976, which was won by Lars Elvstrøm.

Jonas Svensson won the title by defeating Anders Järryd 6–7(5–7), 6–2, 6–2 in the final.

Seeds

Draw

Finals

Top half

Bottom half

References

External links
 Official results archive (ATP)
 Official results archive (ITF)

Copenhagen Open
Singles